Tracey Morris (born 9 September 1967) is a British long-distance runner.

Early career

Morris grew up in Anglesey, Wales and ran as a Welsh schoolgirl, but stopped running soon after. She moved to Leeds and in 1998, aged 30, she resumed running to keep fit
, and took part in the London Marathon running for charity.

In December 2003 she took part in a local event the 'Leeds Abbey Dash' and finished as the first woman just ahead of Bev Jenkins
. The race was watched by UK Athletics' Bud Baldero
 who invited her to join the Great Britain Marathon squad. Baldero also ensured she had a place in the 2004 London Marathon for which her application had not been successful. She was the only non-professional runner to be invited to take part. In January 2004 she won two domestic half marathon races, the Brass Monkey Half Marathon and Four Villages Half Marathon.

On 18 April 2004, she stood on the Blackheath, London starting line not knowing what was to come. But as a relatively unknown runner she burst into the public conscience by becoming the first British woman in the London Marathon. She was so unknown that one of the then British fastest runners, Birhan Dagne, did not try to finish in front of her as "I did not know who she was".

International Competition

Road races

References

External links

1967 births
Living people
Sportspeople from Anglesey
Welsh female long-distance runners
Welsh female marathon runners
British female long-distance runners
British female marathon runners
Olympic athletes of Great Britain
Athletes (track and field) at the 2004 Summer Olympics
World Athletics Championships athletes for Great Britain
Athletes (track and field) at the 2006 Commonwealth Games
Commonwealth Games competitors for Wales